Naldanga Upazila is a subdistrict of Natore District, within Rajshahi Division in northern Bangladesh. Naldanga was previously a union of Natore Upazila in Rajshahi Division of Bangladesh but, in a Government gazette published in May 2013, Naldanga was declared an upazila of Bangladesh.

References

Upazilas of Natore District